Saint-Hubert-de-Rivière-du-Loup is a municipality in Quebec, Canada, in the administrative region of Bas-Saint-Laurent and the regional county municipality of Rivière-du-Loup.

Notable people
Leo Kerouac, father of author and poet Jack Kerouac

See also
 List of municipalities in Quebec

References

External links
 

Municipalities in Quebec
Incorporated places in Bas-Saint-Laurent
Canada geography articles needing translation from French Wikipedia